A valve job is an operation which is performed on any four stroke cycle, internal combustion engine, the purpose of which is to resurface the mating surfaces of the poppet valves and their respective valve seats that control the intake and exhaust of the air/fuel mixture that powers the motion of the pistons after the start cycle.

In the earliest automotive engines, the valves needed to be removed and the sealing surfaces sanded, ground or lapped multiple times during the life of a typical engine. As the decades passed, however, engines ran cleaner and the addition of tetraethyllead in gasoline meant that such maintenance became less frequent. Today, valve jobs are rarely done on passenger cars for the purpose of maintenance, although they are still quite common with high-performance cars.  Some reasons that may induce the need for a valve job in a modern passenger car include: excessive RPM, high mileage, overheating, material failure, corrosion, and foreign object damage (FOD).

A valve job is best done with grinding stones and either electric or pneumatic tools.  Lapping compound and a lapping tool may be used, and is more economical for home auto repair, however lapping will only provide limited results and will not be effective on a valve or seat with anything more than very light wear or damage.

Modern engines have cylinder heads made of either iron or aluminum.  Iron cylinder heads most often have integral iron valve seats.  These seats are the softest and most susceptible to wear among modern engines.  Aluminum cylinder heads, however, have hardened steel valve seats, as aluminum would make a very poor seat.  These hardened steel seats are significantly better than the integral seats of an iron head, and can be relatively easily removed and replaced if needed.  If an integral iron seat needs to be replaced, the seat must be milled to allow the insertion of a new seat.  The new seat is then installed with application of a high-strength metal glue/adhesive.  Once installed, the seat is ground to the correct angle and width.

Valves and seats will usually have the same angle to mate properly.  That angle is usually 45 degrees, but 30 degrees can be found in many modern applications.  The mating angle is often accompanied by top and bottom angle cuts that are 15 degrees from each side of the mating angle (e.g. for a 45 degree seat, the top and bottom angles would be 30 and 60 degrees respectively).  This method increases air-flow, which gives mild horsepower, response, and efficiency improvements.

The seat mating angle of an intake seat will typically be one-half the width of the valve face (on a stock engine).  High performance applications will often have a very thin intake mating seat of approximately .025" to .030".  Exhaust seats should be about .060" less than the valve face, with the mating surface of the seat being .030" from both top and bottom of the valve face (putting the mating of the two in the middle of the valve face).  

Valves should be inspected for damage which will prevent proper operation and could lead to catastrophic failure. Cracking, pitting, channeling, and burning are typical problems leading to valve replacement. Even hair-line cracks make a valve unusable.  Pitting is permissible in small amounts, but should not be present on the face, margin, or stem. Channeling is a result of uneven heating of a valve (typically from improper seating during operation), and is evident by heat discoloration in an oval shape on the bottom of the valve and often visible at the base of the valve stem. Channeling that continues will lead to a burnt valve, which leads to melting away of a portion of the valve. If an engine is subjected to excessive RPM or sudden stoppage, all valves should be inspected for straightness. If a valve is bent, it will lead to failure very quickly and often damage other parts such as pistons, cylinder walls, other valves, valve guides, and valve-train components.

Some older cars have relatively soft valve seats that wear faster when operated without leaded fuel. These usually can be updated with hardened valve seats that resist wear, regardless of whether leaded or unleaded fuel is used.

References 

Engine valves